In the Book of Exodus, Amram is the husband of Jochebed and father of Aaron, Moses and Miriam.

In the Bible 

In addition to being married to Jochebed, Amram is also described in the Bible as having been related to Jochebed prior to the marriage, although the exact relationship is uncertain; some Greek and Latin manuscripts of the Septuagint state that Jochebed was Amram's father's cousin, and others state that Amram was Jochebed's cousin, but the Masoretic Text states that she was his father's sister.  He is praised for his faith in the Epistle to the Hebrews.

Textual scholars attribute the biblical genealogy to the Book of Generations, a hypothetically reconstructed document theorized to originate from a similar religiopolitical group and date to the priestly source. According to critical scholars, the Torah's genealogy for Levi's descendants, is actually an aetiological myth reflecting the fact that there were four different groups among the Levites – the Gershonites, Kohathites, Merarites, and Aaronids; Aaron – the eponymous ancestor of the Aaronids – could not be portrayed as a brother to Gershon, Kohath, and Merari, as the narrative about the birth of Moses (brother of Aaron), which textual scholars attribute to the earlier Elohist source, mentions only that both his parents were Levites (without identifying their names). Critical scholars suspect that the Elohist account offers both matrilineal and patrilineal descent from Levites in order to magnify the religious credentials of Moses.

Arabic 
Amram in Arabic is spelled  (‘Imrān ). He was the husband of Jochebed and father of Musa and Harun. (In the Quran there is a whole chapter named Al-Imran. He is not to be confused with Maryam’s father, whose name is also Imran, mentioned in at least two verses as the father of Maryam, the mother of Isa.) This is reflected by the given name, Mūsā bin ‘Imrān, which means Moses, son of Amram.

Family tree 

According to the Septuagint, Amram's family tree would be as follows:

According to the Masoretic Text, Amram's family tree would be:

According to The Book of Jasher (Midrash), Amram's family tree would be:

  Amram married his aunt, Jochebed, the sister of his father Kehath.

In rabbinical and apocryphal literature 

In the Apocryphal Testament of Levi, it is stated that Amram was born, as a grandson of Levi, when Levi was 64 years old. The Exodus Rabbah argues that when the Pharaoh instructed midwives to throw male children into the Nile, Amram divorced Jochebed, who was three months pregnant with Moses at the time, arguing that there was no justification for the Israelite men to father children if they were just to be killed; however, the text goes on to state that Miriam, his daughter, chided him for his lack of care for his wife's feelings, persuading him to recant and marry Jochebed again. According to the Talmud, Amram promulgated the laws of marriage and divorce amongst the Jews in Egypt; the Talmud also argues that Amram had extreme longevity, which he used to ensure that doctrines were preserved through several generations.

Despite the legend of his divorce and remarriage, Amram was also held to have been entirely sinless throughout his life, and was rewarded for this by his corpse remaining without any signs of decay.  The other three  ancient Israelites who died without sin, being Benjamin, Jesse and Chileab.

According to the Book of Jubilees, Amram was among the Israelites who took the bones of Jacob's sons (excluding those of Joseph) to Canaan for burial in the cave of Machpelah. Most of the Israelites then returned to Egypt but some remained in Canaan. Those who remained included Amram, who only returned somewhere up to forty years later.

One of the Dead Sea Scrolls (4Q544, Manuscript B) is written from Amram's point of view, and hence has been dubbed the Visions of Amram. The document is dated to the 2nd century BC and, in the form of a vision, briefly discusses dualism and the Watchers:

See also 
 Al Imran, "The Family of Imran", 3rd chapter of the Quran 
Joachim, father of Mary, mother of Jesus

References 

Ancient Egyptian Jews
Levites
Book of Exodus people
People of the Quran
Moses
Family of Aaron
Tribe of Levi
Book of Jubilees
Epistle to the Hebrews
Incest in mythology